James Piccoli (born 5 September 1991) is a Canadian professional road racing cyclist, who currently rides for UCI WorldTeam . In October 2020, he was named in the startlist for the 2020 Vuelta a España.

Piccoli rose to prominence in 2018, becoming dominant on the North American circuit, winning the Tour de Beauce, and finishing second overall at the 2019 Tour of Utah in addition to winning the prologue stage. He stayed with the team through the 2022 season, before confirming that he would not return for 2023, and has not yet announced his plans for the 2023 season.

Major results

2013
 Canada Summer Games
2nd  Road race
3rd  Time trial
2015
 3rd Mount Washington Auto Road Bicycle Hillclimb
2016
 1st Tobago Cycling Classic
2017
 1st  Overall Tour of Southland
1st Stage 4
 2nd Overall Valley of the Sun Stage Race
 9th Overall Tour of Alberta
 10th Overall Tour of Utah
2018
 1st  Overall Tour de Beauce
1st Stage 4
 6th Overall Tour of the Gila
 7th Overall Colorado Classic
2019
 2nd Overall Tour of Utah
1st Prologue
 2nd Overall Tour de Beauce
1st Stage 2
 2nd Overall Tour de Taiwan
1st Stage 4
 5th Road race, National Road Championships
2020
 10th Overall Tour de Hongrie
2021
 1st Stage 1b (TTT) Settimana Internazionale di Coppi e Bartali
 2nd Overall Tour du Rwanda
 8th Overall Vuelta a Andalucía

Grand Tour general classification results timeline

References

External links

1991 births
Living people
Canadian male cyclists
Cyclists from Montreal